Grand Casino Portorož is located in Portorož and is the oldest casino in Slovenia. It is owned and operated by Casino Portorož d.d. The casino was renovated in 2012.

History

Background and opening (1913)
Grand Casino Portorož was built in 1913 and is the oldest Slovenian Casino. In Slovenia, the gambling sector is subject to strict regulation by the state, Casino Portorož d.d. is the first owner of the Slovenian license for Online Casino.

Gaming

Slot machines
251 gaming machines of the latest generation.

Table games
American Roulette
French Roulette
Blackjack
Caribbean Poker
Midi Punto Banco
Texas Hold'em Bonus Poker

Bingo
Cinquina
Bingo
Super Bingo

See also
Slovenia
Portorož

References

External links

Casinos completed in 1913